Nancy Calhoun (born July 10, 1944) was a Republican member of the New York State Assembly for the 96th district. She was first elected in 1990. Born in Suffern, New York, she began her career as in 1976 as Washingtonville Central School District Tax Collector and served in the position until 1984. She elected to the  Blooming Grove town board in 1982 and served until 1985. She was elected Supervisor of the town of Blooming Grove in 1985 and served until 1990.

After losing the nomination of the Orange County Republican Party, Calhoun decided to retire after 22 years in the Assembly. The district was re-numbered as the 99th, and Democrat James Skoufis won the 2012 election to represent this area now.

References

Living people
Republican Party members of the New York State Assembly
Politicians from Orange County, New York
Women state legislators in New York (state)
Politicians from Rockland County, New York
Place of birth missing (living people)
1944 births
People from Suffern, New York
People from Blooming Grove, New York
21st-century American politicians
21st-century American women politicians